Tell Qaramel (also Tel Qaramel or Tel al-Qaramel) is a tell, or archaeological mound, located  in the north of present-day Syria, 25 km north of Aleppo and about 65 km south of the Taurus mountains, adjacent to the river Quweiq that flows to Aleppo.

Site
The site is located in a fertile river valley that has been an important trade route; a railway still runs between the present-day village and the tell, transecting the neolithic site. The tell lies between the current village and the Quweiq river to the east, and its summit is measured at 444 m above sea level; the neolithic site extends to the south and lies about 20m lower (Mazurowski p. 12,p. 20).

Excavations
A survey in the late 1970s found evidence of settlement at the site from the Pre-Pottery Neolithic A period through to the Hellenistic period.  The later phases of occupation are closely associated with the mound of the tell itself. The pre-pottery Neolithic phase however is associated with a wider area of about 3.5 hectares, extending to the south and south-west of the tell and covered by up to 2.5 m of later deposits through the Bronze Age and Iron Age. It is this area that has been the focus of detailed investigation since 1999 by a joint Polish-Syrian team led by Ryszard F. Mazurowski of Warsaw University and Dr.Youssef Kanjou from Aleppo Museum (https://uni-tzuebingen.academia.edu/DrYoussefKanjou) under the auspices of the Polish Centre of Mediterranean Archaeology University of Warsaw. Thus far about six areas have been investigated and four excavated: only about 1.5% of the entire site (Mazurowski p. 18). After 2011 the excavations have been suspended due to the civil war in Syria.

Before the excavations began, it was assumed that permanent sedentary settlements would occur only in combination with the first farming of cereals, and the first domestication and keeping of animals such as sheep and goats, marking the start of the Neolithic period, part of a transition between the proto-Neolithic and Pre-Pottery Neolithic A cultures. However the remains of the structures uncovered at Tell Qaramel appear to be older than this, giving the first evidence of permanent stone-built settlement. The site is roughly contemporary to that of Göbekli Tepe in Turkey.

Stratigraphy and chronology
The archeologists distinguish a preliminary epipaleolithic phase (Horizon 0) attested mostly by flint tools but no certain carbon samples. For the subsequent settlement they recognise 4 Early Aceramic Neolithic layers (Horizon 1 to 4) which according to radiocarbon dating have been partially overlapping (contemporary).

The excavators find an unbroken development (in contrast to e.g. in Jericho in the southern Levant) so are skeptical about the common division in "Pre-Pottery Neolithic A" and  "Pre-Pottery Neolithic B" phases, instead preferring "Early Aceramic Neolithic" for the proto-neolithic and PPNA, and "Late Aceramic Neolithic" for PPNB and PPNC.

The dating is not without problems. The archeologists rejected several samples because the radiocarbon dates were inconsistent with the stratigraphy, but also otherwise the very early dates at Tell Qaramel appear too old as compared to dating of similar cultural phases at other sites. Comparison of the laboratory in Gliwice, Poland (code Gd) that executed the C14 analyses, with other laboratories, showed differences in either direction.

Highlights
Particularly striking are the remains of a succession of five round stone structures which the excavators recognise as the remains of towers (Mazurowski et al. 2012 pp. 48..52 ). The lower, oldest one was about 6 m in diameter and appears to have had some communal function, having an elevated hearth at the center with two benches centered on it. It was damaged by fire and rebuilt, and may have been a defensive structure. The earliest phase has been carbon-dated to between the eleventh millennium and 9670 BC. This dating makes the structure roughly two millennia older than the stone tower found at Jericho, which was previously believed to be the oldest known tower structure in the world.

Among the ornaments found was a rather large (52×40×26 mm) polished copper nugget from Horizon 2 - one of the earliest finds of metal in an archeological site. As malachite (copper carbonate) has been excavated too in Tell Qaramel, the copper nugget may have been collected from the (as yet unidentified) malachite source. An attempt had been made to drill a hole through the copper like with other stone beads, but technology was not yet sufficiently advanced to process metal (Mazurowski 2012 p. 80; Plate 137A p. 280 ).

Mortuary practices
Remains of 20 individuals have been excavated, 
all adults: this may indicate that burial practice for infants and children was different, at another (as yet undiscovered) location or treated with less regard. Most bodies had their head removed, either by cutting shortly after death (as indicated by cut marks, and having the 1st vertebra remain with the skull), or after decay (leaving the vertebrae and lower mandible with the skeleton). This indicates a head cult, as is also attested in other pre-pottery Neolithic sites (notably Jericho, Tell Aswad, and Cayonu). While in some skulls teeth showed wear and caries, which is typical for a diet with carbohydrates like from grain, others were in good condition, which may indicate a pre-Neolithic diet.

See also

Cities of the ancient Near East

References

Further reading
 R.F. Mazurowski et al (1999–2007), Tell Qaramel: Excavations, Polish Archaeology in the Mediterranean, 11, 285–296 (1999); 12, 327–341 (2000); 13, 295–307 (2001); 14, 315–330 (2002); 15, 355–370 (2003); 16, 497–510 (2004); 17, 483–499 (2005); 18, 571–586 (2006); 19, 565–585 (2007)
 
 R.F. Mazurowski et al (2009), Chronology of the Early Pre-Pottery Neolithic Settlement Tell Qaramel, Northern Syria, in the Light of Radiocarbon Dating, Radiocarbon, 51(2) 771–781. (Abstract)
 R.F. Mazurowski, Y. Kanjou (eds., 2012), Tell Qaramel 1999–2007. Protoneolithic and Early Pre-pottery Neolithic Settlement in Northern Syria. Warsaw: Polish Centre of Mediterranean Archaeology.  .

External links
 Joint Syro-Polish Qaramel expedition
 Discussion of the radiocarbon dates, PPND - the Platform for Neolithic Radiocarbon Dates, Ex Oriente eV, Free University of Berlin.

Stone Age sites in Syria
Neolithic sites in Syria
Neolithic settlements
Neolithic sites
Archaeological sites in Aleppo Governorate
10th millennium BC
Pre-Pottery Neolithic A